Rita Peri (born 22 May 1957) is an Italian former gymnast. She competed at the 1972 Summer Olympics and the 1976 Summer Olympics.

References

External links
 

1957 births
Living people
Italian female artistic gymnasts
Olympic gymnasts of Italy
Gymnasts at the 1972 Summer Olympics
Gymnasts at the 1976 Summer Olympics
People from Novara
Sportspeople from the Province of Novara